The name Lennon is both a surname and a given name that has grown in popularity in English-speaking countries in recent years for both boys and girls.

Origins include Irish Ó Leannáin ("descendant of Lover (leannán)") and from Ó Lionáin ("descendant of Blackbird (Lonán)").

Notable people and characters with the name include:

Surname 
 John Lennon (1940–1980), singer, musician, poet and songwriter, founder of The Beatles
 Cynthia Lennon (1939–2015), John Lennon's first wife (born Cynthia Powell)
 Julian Lennon (born 1963), John Lennon's first son with Cynthia Powell
 Sean Lennon (born 1975), John Lennon's second son with Yoko Ono
 Freddie Lennon and Julia Lennon, parents of John Lennon
 The Lennon Sisters, four siblings who sang together as part of an act, most notably seen on The Lawrence Welk Show
 Dianne Lennon, American singer
 Janet Lennon, American singer
 Kathy Lennon, American singer
 Peggy Lennon, American singer
 The members of Venice (band):
 Kipp Lennon (born 1960), American musician
 Mark Lennon, American musician
 Michael Lennon, American musician
 Pat Lennon, American musician
 Aaron Lennon (born 1987), English footballer
 Alton Lennon, Democratic U.S. senator from the state of North Carolina
 Ben Lennon, Australian rules footballer
 Bill Lennon (1845–1910), American baseball player
 Bruce Lennon, Australian rules footballer
 Caroline Lennon, Irish actor
 Dennis Lennon (1918–1991), British architect and interior designer
 Harry Lennon (born 1994), English footballer
 Jimmy Lennon (1913–1992), American boxing ring announcer (Jimmy Lennon Sr or Jr)
 John Lennon (disambiguation), several people
 J. Robert Lennon, American novelist, short story writer, musician and composer
 Joseph Lennon (1933–1990), Irish politician
 Keith Lennon, character from Magical DoReMi
 Mark Lennon (born 1980), Australian rugby player
 Michael Lennon (disambiguation), several people
 Monica Lennon, Scottish politician
 Neil Lennon (born 1971), Northern Irish footballer
 Patrick Lennon (disambiguation), several people
 Paul Lennon (born 1955), Australian politician
 Peter Lennon (1930–2011), Irish journalist and filmmaker
 Richard Lennon (1947–2019), American Roman Catholic bishop
 Stephen Lennon, guitarist in The Questions
 Stephen Yaxley-Lennon (born 1982), British political activist, known as Tommy Robinson
 Steven Lennon (born 1988), Scottish footballer
 Thomas Lennon (disambiguation), several people
 William Lennon (1849–1938), politician in Queensland, Australia

Given name 
 Lennon Greggians (born 1999), Welsh rugby player
 Lennon Lacy (died 2014), American student and alleged murder victim
 Lennon Murphy (born 1982), American rock singer
 Lennon Parham (born 1976), American actress and comedian
 Lennon Stella (born 1999), Canadian singer and actress

See also 
Lennon (disambiguation)
Lenin (disambiguation)

References
 

English-language surnames
Surnames
Surnames of Irish origin
Anglicised Irish-language surnames

fr:Lennon
pt:Lennon (desambiguação)
ro:Lennon (dezambiguizare)
ru:Леннон (значения)
fi:Lennon